Stacy Lattisaw Jackson (née Lattisaw; born November 25, 1966) is an American R&B singer from Washington, D.C., United States.

Career
The 1979 song "Ring My Bell" was originally written for then twelve-year-old Lattisaw, as a teenybopper song about kids talking on the telephone. When Lattisaw signed with a different label, Anita Ward was asked to sing it instead, and it became Ward's only major hit.

Lattisaw recorded her first album for Cotillion Records at the age of 12 in 1979, under the direction of record producer Van McCoy. However, it was not until she affiliated with Narada Michael Walden, a former drummer with the Mahavishnu Orchestra who was just beginning a career as a producer, that she found larger success. Under Walden's direction, she scored several R&B hit albums between 1981 and 1986. She also opened for the Jacksons' Triumph Tour in 1981.

During the 1980s and early 1990s, Lattisaw had several US R&B hit singles, and a 1980 top 3 hit in the UK with her song "Jump to the Beat". She also scored three moderate hits on the US Hot 100 chart; "Let Me Be Your Angel" (US No. 21), "Love on a Two-Way Street" (US No. 26), and "Miracles" (US No. 40). She signed with Motown Records in 1986. She scored her only No. 1 R&B hit with duet partner Johnny Gill, titled "Where Do We Go from Here", in 1989. Since the 1990s, she has exclusively sung gospel music. Her official website stated that she was to work on a gospel CD. In 2010, Lattisaw's music career was chronicled on the TV One docu-series Unsung, in which she also appeared.

Discography

Studio albums

Compilation albums
The Very Best of Stacy Lattisaw (1998, Rhino)
Stacey Lattisaw - The Cotillion Years 1979 - 1985 (2021,  Robinsongs)

Singles

See also
List of disco artists (S–Z)
List of artists who reached number one on the U.S. Dance Club Songs chart
List of people from Washington, D.C.
List of artists who reached number one on the Billboard R&B chart
List of number-one dance singles of 1980 (U.S.)
List of number-one R&B singles of 1990 (U.S.)
American Music Awards of 1982

References

External links
Stacy Lattisaw on Myspace
Stacy Lattisaw at YouTube

1966 births
American women singers
American child singers
American dance musicians
African-American women singers
American rhythm and blues singers
American gospel singers
American sopranos
Living people
Motown artists
Atlantic Records artists
Winners of Yamaha Music Festival
Singers from Washington, D.C.
Dance-pop musicians
20th-century American women
21st-century American women